This article is about the particular significance of the year 1700 to Wales and its people.

Incumbents
Lord Lieutenant of North Wales (Lord Lieutenant of Anglesey, Caernarvonshire, Denbighshire, Flintshire, Merionethshire, Montgomeryshire) – Charles Gerard, 2nd Earl of Macclesfield
Lord Lieutenant of South Wales (Lord Lieutenant of Glamorgan, Brecknockshire, Cardiganshire, Carmarthenshire, Monmouthshire, Pembrokeshire, Radnorshire) – Thomas Herbert, 8th Earl of Pembroke

Bishop of Bangor – Humphrey Humphreys
Bishop of Llandaff – William Beaw
Bishop of St Asaph – Edward Jones
Bishop of St Davids – vacant

Events
date unknown
Quaker emigrant Rowland Ellis is elected to represent Philadelphia in the provincial assembly.
Evan Evans travels from Wales to become rector of Christ Church, Philadelphia
The Gower family immigrates from Worcestershire into Wales.

Arts and literature

New books
John Jones – The Mysteries of Opium Revealed 
David Maurice 
Arweiniwr cartrefol i'r iawn a'r buddiol dderbyniad o Swperyr Arglwydd
The Promised Reed; a sermon preach'd … for the support of weak Christians

Births
8 March – William Morgan the elder, of Tredegar, politician (died 1731)
May – Sir George Wynne, 1st Baronet, of Leeswood Hall, Flintshire, landowner and politician (died 1756)
date unknown
John Jones, clergyman and controversialist (died 1770)
Benjamin Meredith, Baptist minister (died 1749)
Guto Nyth Brân (Griffith Morgan), legendary athlete (died 1737)
probable
John Edwards (Siôn y Potiau), poet (died 1776)
Lewis Evans, surveyor (died 1756)

Deaths
21 January – Henry Somerset, 1st Duke of Beaufort, politician, 70/71
15 March – Hugh Owen, independent minister
11 July – Sir William Williams, 1st Baronet, of Gray's Inn, 65/66
19 July – John Evans, Puritan clergyman and teacher, 51/52
15 September – Sir John Aubrey, 2nd Baronet, about 50 (injuries from a fall)
16 December – Thomas Morgan (of Dderw), politician, 36 (smallpox)
probable – Owen Wynne, lawyer and civil servant, about 48

See also
1700 in Scotland

References

1700s in Wales